Deep Run is a tributary of Dawson Creek in Pamlico County, North Carolina in the United States.

References

Rivers of North Carolina